Flammeovirga yaeyamensis is a bacterium from the genus of Flammeovirga which has been isolated from the seaweed Digenea simplex from the Yaeyama Islands on Japan.

References

Further reading

External links
Type strain of Flammeovirga yaeyamensis at BacDive -  the Bacterial Diversity Metadatabase	

Cytophagia
Bacteria described in 2006